Rob Janoff is an American graphic designer of corporate logos and identities, printed advertisements and television commercials. He is known for his creation of the Apple logo.

In 1977, Janoff worked for Regis McKenna as an art director and was tasked to design the logo for Steve Jobs of Apple Computer, creating an apple with a bite out of it, included so that people did not mistake the apple for a cherry or another fruit. The colored stripes in the logo were to indicate that Apple machines had color screens. Each stripe was printed in its own specially mixed color, which Jobs approved because he felt the more vivid colors improved people's emotional response. Rob also created ads and printed materials for Apple. The basic design of his Apple logo is still in use by the company today, but it has had many elements changed along the way. Later he did design work for both IBM and Intel.

Early life
Janoff was born and raised in Culver City, California. He obtained his degree from San Jose State University where he initially majored in industrial design. After later realizing that this was not the area of study he was particularly interested in, Janoff then focused on graphic design.

Career

In 1970, upon graduating from San Jose State University, Janoff began working for a number of small Silicon Valley agencies. In 1977, he joined Regis McKenna located in Palo Alto, California. While working in this position, he was chosen to design the corporate identity package for Apple Computer.

Janoff later worked for agencies established in New York City and Chicago such as Chiat/Day where he designed print, TV advertising and branding for numerous national and international clients.

Over the past six years he has established a digital agency with his Australian business partner, Joel Bohm.

While residing in Chicago, Rob Janoff travels extensively as part of his work creating branding outcomes for companies across a broad range of industries. He is also a speaker who has delivered keynote addresses and classes in design for universities and academic facilities, including the Eastern Mediterranean University in Cyprus.

References
https://www.forbes.com/sites/willburns/2018/03/26/rob-janoff-and-the-fascinating-true-story-behind-his-original-apple-logo-design/

External links
 

Logo designers
Living people
People from Culver City, California
Year of birth missing (living people)